Eyiaba itapetinga is a species of beetle in the family Cerambycidae. It was described by Galileo and Martins in 2004.

References

Apomecynini
Beetles described in 2004